Remember Roses is the debut studio album by Israeli pop group Lola Marsh. It was released worldwide on 9 June 2017.

Tracks

Charts

References

2017 albums
Albums produced by Johnny Goldstein